The 1942 Manchester Gorton by-election was held on 11 March 1942.  The by-election was held due to the elevation to the peerage of the incumbent Labour MP, William Wedgwood Benn.  It was won by the Labour candidate William Oldfield.

References

1942 in England
1942 elections in the United Kingdom
Gorton
Unopposed by-elections to the Parliament of the United Kingdom (need citation)
1940s in Manchester